The State of New Mexico has a total of four metropolitan statistical areas (MSAs) that are fully or partially located in the state. 7 of the state's 33 counties are classified by the United States Census Bureau as metropolitan. As of the 2000 census, these counties had a combined population 1,147,424 (63.1% of the state's total population). Based on a July 1, 2009 population estimate, that figure rose to 1,335,985 (66.5% of the state's total population).

Metropolitan areas
Albuquerque MSA
Bernalillo County
Sandoval County
Torrance County
Valencia County
Farmington MSA
San Juan County
Las Cruces MSA
Doña Ana County
Santa Fe MSA
Santa Fe County

Population statistics

Combined Statistical Areas

The United States Census Bureau defines a Combined Statistical Area (CSA) as an aggregate of adjacent Core Based Statistical Areas (CBSAs) that are linked by commuting ties. There are three combined statistical areas in New Mexico, with one crossing into Texas.

Albuquerque-Santa Fe-Las Vegas CSA
Albuquerque Metropolitan Statistical Area
Bernalillo County
Sandoval County
Torrance County
Valencia County
Santa Fe Metropolitan Statistical Area
Santa Fe County
Las Vegas Micropolitan Statistical Area
San Miguel County
Espanola Micropolitan Statistical Area
Rio Arriba County
Grants Micropolitan Statistical Area
Cibola County
Los Alamos Micropolitan Statistical Area
Los Alamos County
El Paso-Las Cruces CSA
El Paso Metropolitan Statistical Area
El Paso County, Texas
Hudspeth County, Texas
Las Cruces Metropolitan Statistical Area
Doña Ana County, New Mexico
Clovis-Portales CSA
Clovis Micropolitan Statistical Area
Curry County
Portales Micropolitan Statistical Area
Roosevelt County

Population statistics

See also
List of micropolitan areas in New Mexico
List of cities in New Mexico
New Mexico census statistical areas
Table of United States primary census statistical areas (PCSA)
Table of United States Combined Statistical Areas (CSA)
Table of United States Metropolitan Statistical Areas (MSA)
Table of United States Micropolitan Statistical Areas (μSA)

References

 

Demographics of New Mexico
Metropolitan areas
New M